Nathalie Roussel (born 14 September 1956) is a French actress of stage, television and film. She is best known for her role in the 1991 films My Father's Glory and My Mother's Castle.

Filmography

Les violons du bal (1974) .... La soeur de Michel/Michel's Sister
Le Cri du coeur (1974) .... Babette
Section spéciale (1975)
Speak to Me of Love (1975) .... Anne
Banlieue Sud-Est (1977) (mini) TV Series .... Zézette
Mazarin (1978) (mini) TV Series .... Marie Mancini
Les Givrés (1979) .... Nathalie
Le Jeune homme vert (1979) (mini) TV Series .... Chantal
La Pharisienne (1980) (TV) .... Michèle Pian
Guy de Maupassant (1982)
Julien Fontanes, magistrat (1983) .... Rose
My Father's Glory (1990) .... Augustine
L'Or et le papier (1990) TV Series .... Jeanne Bouvier
My Mother's Castle (1990) .... Augustine
A Mere Mortal (Simple mortel) (1991) .... Brigitte
Mayrig (1992) .... Gayane
Les Coeurs brulés (1992) TV Series
L'Affaire Seznec (1993) (TV) .... Marie-Jeanne Seznec
Antoine Rives, juge du terrorisme (1993) TV Series .... Commissaire Claire Devaux
588 rue paradis (1993) .... Gayane
3000 scénarios contre un virus (1994) .... (segment L'Exclusion)
Ange Espérandieu (1995) (TV) .... Dolores
Un homme est tombé dans la rue (1996)
Il barone (1996) (mini) TV Series .... Annalisa
Mon père avait raison (1996) (TV) .... Loulou
Le Grand Batre (1997) (TV) .... Zanie
Dossier: disparus (1998) TV Series .... Florence Sobel
T'aime (2000) .... Jeanne Michel
Route de nuit (2000) (TV) .... Mathilde
Les Rois mages (2001) .... La mère de Macha
Commissariat Bastille (2001) TV Series .... Marie (2001–2003)
Joséphine, ange gardien (2002) TV Series .... Anne (1 Episode)
Moments de vérité (2004) (TV) .... Marie
Inside (2007) .... Louise Scarangelo

Personal life
Roussel was married to David Toscan du Plantier, the son of the French film producer Daniel Toscan du Plantier and the French actress Marie-Christine Barrault.  Their daughter Marie was born in 1995.

References

External links

French film actresses
French television actresses
French stage actresses
1956 births
Living people
20th-century French actresses
21st-century French actresses